The 2001 Volvo Women's Open was a women's tennis tournament played on outdoor hard courts in Pattaya, Thailand. It was part of Tier V of the 2001 WTA Tour. It was the 11th edition of the tournament and was held from 5 November through 11 November 2001. Seventh-seeded Patty Schnyder won the singles title and earned $16,000 first-prize money.

Finals

Singles

 Patty Schnyder defeated  Henrieta Nagyová, 6–0, 6–4
 This was Schnyder's 1st singles title of the year and the 7th of her career.

Doubles

 Åsa Carlsson /  Iroda Tulyaganova defeated  Liezel Huber /  Wynne Prakusya, 4–6, 6–3, 6–3

References

External links
 ITF tournament edition details
 Tournament draws

 
 WTA Tour
 in women's tennis
Tennis, WTA Tour, Volvo Women's Open
Tennis, WTA Tour, Volvo Women's Open

Tennis, WTA Tour, Volvo Women's Open